Chris Byrd vs. Wladimir Klitschko II, billed as "Revenge Is The Name Of The Game", was a professional boxing match contested on 22 April 2006 for the IBF and vacant IBO heavyweight championship.

Background
After beating Evander Holyfield in 2002 to win the IBF title, Byrd has successfully defended the IBF belt four times against Fres Oquendo, Andrew Golota, Jameel McCline, and DaVarryl Williamson. At the time he was ranked as the best Heavyweight in the world by Ring magazine (Wladimir Klitschko was 8th).

Klitschko had won four fights in his comeback from his shock defeat to Lamon Brewster while trying to regain the WBO title he had lost to Corrie Sanders in 2003.

The two men had fought six years earlier with Wladimir winning via a unanimous decision.

The fight
The fight was a one sided affair with Klitschko dominating Byrd before Klitschko's right hook finished off the American 41 seconds into round 7, the second time Byrd was floored in the fight.

Aftermath
Byrd had originally planned to fight then reigning WBA champion Nicolai Valuev; he would instead go on to lose to Alexander Povetkin before briefly returning to the light heavyweight division and ultimately retiring in 2010 with the record of 41–5–1.

Klitschko held the IBF title for a record-breaking 3,507 days before his defeat at the hands of Tyson Fury in November 2015.

This fight would mark the fourth time trainer Emanuel Steward guided a fighter to a Heavyweight title, after Evander Holyfield, Oliver McCall and Lennox Lewis.

Undercard
Confirmed bouts:

Broadcasting

References

2006 in boxing
International Boxing Federation heavyweight championship matches
Boxing in Germany
2006 in German sport
Klitschko brothers
Sports competitions in Mannheim
April 2006 sports events in Europe
Boxing on HBO
Boxing matches